Hofen may mean:

 Hofen, Switzerland, a municipality in the Canton of Schaffhausen
 Hofen, a former community incorporated into modern Friedrichshafen, Germany
 Shahe fen or Héfěn (河粉, river vermicelli), a Chinese noodle dish similar to phở

See also
 Höfen (disambiguation)

Mia and Hanna